Rockyford is an unincorporated community in Oglala Lakota County, in the U.S. state of South Dakota. It is on the Pine Ridge Indian Reservation.

History
A post office called Rockyford was established in 1923, and remained in operation until 1958. The community was named for a rocky ford on the river near the town site.

References

Unincorporated communities in Oglala Lakota County, South Dakota
Unincorporated communities in South Dakota